The Frederick A. and Sophia Bagg Bonanza Farm, also known as Bagg Bonanza Farm or F. A. Bagg Farm, is a former bonanza farm in Richland County, North Dakota, United States. The surviving farm complex is now owned by a local non-profit organization and operates as a museum. It is one of the best-preserved examples of a bonanza farm complex in the nation, and was declared a National Historic Landmark in 2005.

Description and history
The Bagg Bonanza Farm is located on either side of 169th Avenue Southeast in rural Richland County, east and south of Mooreton.  Still surrounded by agricultural fields that were once part of the farm, the main complex consists of a large number of residential buildings and farm-related outbuildings for housing farm animals, feed, and equipment for working the land.  The buildings are laid out in a roughly rectilinear manner, with walls oriented north-south and east-west.  Stylistically the buildings are vernacular, and lack significant ornamentation.  The main house originally served as a bunkhouse at a nearby farm where the Baggs worked before establishing this one, and was adapted by them to house their family and a number of transient farm laborers.

Frederick and Sophia Bagg were foreman and cook respectively at the Downing Farm, and in the 1890s began acquiring land in this area for their own farm. In 1915 they started this farm, which was described by Bagg as essentially a factory operation, using labor division, management,  and cost management techniques from industrial business, but applied to the practice of agriculture. These types of large-scale operations were also made possible by the completion of railroads, which could bring their large harvests to market. The farm was divided by Frederick Bagg among his five children and two of his key personnel.

See also
List of National Historic Landmarks in North Dakota
National Register of Historic Places listings in Richland County, North Dakota

References

External links
Bagg Bonanza Farm - Visiting information
  - Official Website
Wheat Farms, Flour Mills, and Railroads: A Web of Interdependence, a National Park Service Teaching with Historic Places (TwHP) lesson plan

Bonanza farms
Farms on the National Register of Historic Places in North Dakota
Farm museums in the United States
Historic house museums in North Dakota
Houses completed in 1915
Museums in Richland County, North Dakota
National Historic Landmarks in North Dakota
Historic districts on the National Register of Historic Places in North Dakota
National Register of Historic Places in Richland County, North Dakota
1915 establishments in North Dakota